Samuel Young (born 10 October 1902, date of death unknown) was a Jamaican cricketer. He played in six first-class matches for the Jamaican cricket team from 1924 to 1928.

See also
 List of Jamaican representative cricketers

References

External links
 

1902 births
Year of death missing
Jamaican cricketers
Jamaica cricketers
Cricketers from Kingston, Jamaica